Nathanael is a biblical given name derived from the Hebrew נְתַנְאֵל (Netan'el), which means "God/El has given" or "Gift of God/El." Nathaniel is the variant form of this name and it stands to this day as the usual and most common spelling for a masculine given name. Other variants include Nathanel, Netanel and Nathanial.

Several figures in the Bible bear forms of this name. In the Hebrew Bible (Tanakh), the name is shared by a prince (or chieftain) of the Tribe of Issachar (Numbers 7:18–23, in the Naso parsha) and by a brother of King David (1 Chronicles 2:14). In the New Testament, Nathanael is said to be an early follower of Jesus of Nazareth, according to the Gospel of John (1:45; 21:2). 

The related name Elnathan could be rendered "Gift of El" (Hebrew God). A similar ancient name with the same meaning as Elnathan, is Jonathan which signifies "YHWH has given".

In the Bible
 Nathanael (follower of Jesus) in the Gospel of John

Notable people with this name

A
 Nate Ackerman (born 1978), a British-American mathematician and wrestler

B
 Nathanael Ball (1623–1681), an English clergyman, assistant to Brian Walton in his London Polyglot Bible
 Nate Bargatze (born 1979), an American comedian and actor
 Nathanael Barnes (born 1987), an Australian rugby league footballer
 Nathanael Burwash (1839–1918),  a Canadian methodist, minister and university administrator

C
 Nathanael Carpenter (1589 – c. 1628), an English author, philosopher, and geographer
 Nathanael Chalmers (1830–1910), a New Zealand pastoralist, explorer, politician, planter, sugar miller and magistrate
 Nathanael Cousins, an American Magistrate Judge

D
 Nathanael Diesel (1692–1745), a Danish composer

E
 Nathanael Emmons (1745–1840), an American congregational minister

F
 Nathanael Fouquet (born 1972), a French slalom canoeist

G
 Nathanael Gottfried Leske (1751–1786), a German scientist and geologist
 Nathanael Gray, a professor of biological chemistry and molecular pharmacology at Harvard Medical School
 Nathanael Greene (1742–1786), Major General of the Continental Army in the American Revolutionary War
 August Nathanael Grischow (1726–1760), a German mathematician and astronomer

H
 Nathanael Greene Herreshoff (1848–1938), American naval architect

J
 Nathanael Jones (c. 1624 – 1683), a Welsh gentleman-poet

L
 Johann Nathanael Lieberkühn (1711–1756), a German Physician
 Nathanael Liminski (born 1985), a German politician

M
 Nathanael Matthaeus von Wolf (1724–1784), a German botanist, physician and astronomer
 Nathanael Mbourou (born 1996), a Gabonese professional footballer

N
 Nat Neujean (1923–2018), a Belgian sculptor

O
 Nate Oats (born 1974), an American basketball coach
 Nathanael Ogbeta (born 2001), an English footballer
 Nathanael of Ohrid (1820–1906), a Bulgarian cleric, writer and revolutionary from Macedonia
 Nathanael Orr (1917–2016), an Australian politician

P
 Nathanael G. Pendleton (1793–1861), an American politician
 Nathanael Pringsheim (1823–1894), a German botanist

R
 Nathan Ralph (born 1993), an English footballer
 Nathanael Richards (1630–1654), an English dramatist

S
 Nate Saint (1923–1956), an evangelical Christian missionary pilot
 Nathanael Saleh (born 2006), an English actor
 Nathanael Salmon (1675–1742), an English antiquary
 Nathanaël (born Nathalie Stephens, 1970), Canadian writer and translator

V
 Nathanael Villanueva (born 1995), a Filipino footballer
 Nathanael West (1903–1940), American writer

W
 Nathanael Wiseman, an entrepreneur and founder and CEO of Award-winning production company Redeeming Features

People with the name Nathanial
 Nathanial Saltonstall (circa 1639–1707), American judge

See also 
Nathaniel
Natanael (given name)
Nathan (given name)
Nate (given name)

References

Jewish given names
Theophoric names
English masculine given names
Hebrew masculine given names